Gunnar Axel Wright Thorson (31 December 190625 January 1971) was a Danish marine zoologist and ecologist, who studied at the University of Copenhagen under the professors C.G. Johannes Petersen, August Krogh, Theodor Mortensen, Ragnar Spärck and Carl Wesenberg-Lund. In 1957, Thorson was appointed professor of marine biology at the University of Copenhagen.

Thorson studied planktonic larvae of marine benthic invertebrates. He conceived the idea that in the Tropics, benthos tend to produce large numbers of eggs developing into pelagic and widely dispersing larvae, whereas at higher latitudes they tend to produce fewer and larger eggs and offspring. This idea was later coined Thorson's rule.

Thorson participated in the Three-year Expedition to East Greenland led by Lauge Koch. He founded the Marine Biological Laboratory under the University of Copenhagen and was a professor there 1958-1968.

The icebreaker HDMS Gunnar Thorson was named after him.

References

External links
University of Copenhagen Marine Biological Laboratory history - with portrait of Thorson 

20th-century Danish zoologists
Danish marine biologists
Danish ecologists
University of Copenhagen alumni
Academic staff of the University of Copenhagen
1906 births
1971 deaths

Marine zoologists